Reddish is an area of the Metropolitan Borough of Stockport in Greater Manchester, England.

Reddish may also refer to:
 2884 Reddish, a main-belt asteroid
 Reddish House in Broad Chalke, Wiltshire, England

People with the surname
 Cam Reddish (born 1999), American basketball player
 Jack Reddish (1926-1992), American alpine skier
 Sarah Reddish (1850–1928), British trade unionist and suffragette
 Tim Reddish (born 1957), British Paralympic swimmer

See also